The African Journal of Biomedical Research covers all fields within the biomedical sciences including the allied health fields.

External links 
 

Open access journals
General medical journals
English-language journals
Publications established in 1998
Triannual journals